Peter Willis Cawthon (March 24, 1898 – December 31, 1962) was an American football, basketball, and baseball player, coach, and college athletics administrator.  He served as the head football coach at Austin College from 1923 to 1927 and at Texas Technological College—now Texas Tech University—from 1930 to 1940, compiling a career college football coaching record of 99–52–10.  Cawthon was the head coach for the  Brooklyn Dodgers/Tigers of the National Football League (NFL) from 1942 to 1943.  He served as the athletic director at Texas Tech from 1930 to 1941 and the University of Alabama from 1952 to 1953.

Playing career
Cawthon graduated from Houston Central High School in 1917 and went on to attend Southwestern University in Georgetown, Texas. He lettered in baseball, football, and basketball during his freshman year. When the baseball coach left to fight in World War I, Cawthon took over the position. Cawthon earned four letters his sophomore year and was selected as an All-State halfback.

Coaching career
In 1919, Cawthon took his first regular coaching job at Beaumont High School before becoming the baseball and basketball coach at Rice Institute—now Rice University—in 1920. In 1921, he moved to Dallas and was the head football coach at Terrill Prep (TX) for two years.  In 1923, he moved on to coach at Austin College in Sherman, Texas, where he established the Cawthon Trophy, given annually to an outstanding individual at the school on the basis of athletic participation, leadership, and sportsmanship. His record at Austin College was 23–18–4 from 1923 to 1927.  Austin won the Texas Intercollegiate Athletic Association title in 1923.

In 1930, Cawthon  was hired by Texas Technological College—now Texas Tech University. By 1932, the Matadors—now the Red Raiders—became the highest-scoring team in the nation. He coached at the school through the 1940 season. During his tenure, he compiled a record of 76–32–6.

Cawthon served as line coach in football with the Alabama Crimson Tide during the 1942 season. From 1943 to 1944, Cawthon coached in the National Football League for the Brooklyn Dodgers/Tigers. He posted a 2–18 record during his time in the NFL. From 1952 to 1953, Cawthon served as athletic director at the University of Alabama.

Death
Cawthon died after a heart attack on December 31, 1962, in Sherman, Texas.

Head coaching record

Football

Basketball

References

External links
 

1898 births
1962 deaths
American football halfbacks
Alabama Crimson Tide athletic directors
Alabama Crimson Tide football coaches
Austin Kangaroos football coaches
Austin Kangaroos men's basketball coaches
Basketball coaches from Texas
Brooklyn Dodgers (NFL) coaches
Brooklyn Tigers coaches
Detroit Lions coaches
Rice Owls baseball coaches
Rice Owls men's basketball coaches
Southwestern Pirates football players
Texas Tech Red Raiders athletic directors
Texas Tech Red Raiders football coaches
High school football coaches in Texas
Sportspeople from Houston
Players of American football from Houston
Basketball players from Houston